Ethlyn Tate (born 13 May 1966) is a Jamaican sprinter. She competed in the women's 4 × 100 metres relay at the 1988 Summer Olympics.

References

External links
 

1966 births
Living people
Athletes (track and field) at the 1988 Summer Olympics
Jamaican female sprinters
Olympic athletes of Jamaica
Goodwill Games medalists in athletics
Place of birth missing (living people)
Competitors at the 1990 Goodwill Games
Olympic female sprinters
20th-century Jamaican women